In enzymology, a (R)-2-haloacid dehalogenase, DL-2-haloacid halidohydrolase (inversion of configuration), DL-DEXi, (R,S)-2-haloacid dehalogenase (configuration-inverting)) is an enzyme that catalyzes the chemical reaction

(R)-2-haloacid + HO  (S)-2-hydroxyacid + halide

Thus, the two substrates of this enzyme are (R)-2-haloacid and HO, whereas its two products are (S)-2-hydroxyacid and halide.

This enzyme belongs to the family of hydrolases, specifically those acting on halide bonds in carbon-halide compounds.  The systematic name of this enzyme class is (R)-2-haloacid halidohydrolase. Other names in common use include 2-haloalkanoic acid dehalogenase[ambiguous], 2-haloalkanoid acid halidohydrolase[ambiguous], D-2-haloacid dehalogenase, and D-DEX.

References

 
 
 

EC 3.8.1
Enzymes of unknown structure